The 2021 Armed Forces Bowl was a college football bowl game played on December 22, 2021, with kickoff at 8:00 p.m. EST (7:00 p.m. local CST) on ESPN. It was the 19th edition of the Armed Forces Bowl, and was one of the 2021–22 bowl games concluding the 2021 FBS football season. Sponsored by aerospace and defense company Lockheed Martin, the game was officially known as the Lockheed Martin Armed Forces Bowl.

Teams
While the bowl had tie-ins with the American Athletic Conference (AAC) and Conference USA (C-USA), the actual matchup featured a team from the Southeastern Conference (SEC) and an FBS independent.

This was the fifth meeting between Missouri and Army; entering the bowl, the Tigers led the all-time series, 3–2.

Missouri Tigers

Missouri entered the bowl with a 6–6 record (3–5 in SEC play). The Tigers played three ranked teams during the season—Texas A&M, Georgia, and Arkansas—losing each contest. Five of the Tigers' six wins came in their home stadium.

Army Black Knights

Army entered the bowl with an 8–4 overall record. After winning their first four games, the Knights fell to 4–3, then rallied to an 8–3 record before losing their final regular-season contest to Navy. Army lost to the only ranked team they faced, Wake Forest.

Officials 
The officials for the game came from the Big 12 Conference.Referee: Derek Anderson

Umpire: Sheldon Davis

Head Linesman: Al Green

Line Judge: Quentin Givens

Side Judge: Mario Seneca

Field Judge: Scott Gaines

Back Judge: Lyndon Nixon

Center Judge: Darren Winkley

Replay Official: Mark Marsden

Communicator: Buddy Gingras

Alternate Official: Marvel July

Game summary

Statistics

References

External links
Game statistics at statbroadcast.com
Official game program via publogix.com

Armed Forces Bowl
Armed Forces Bowl
Army Black Knights football bowl games
Missouri Tigers football bowl games
Armed Forces Bowl
Armed Forces Bowl